The England national cricket team toured India in 1984-85, playing a five-match Test series  and five match ODI series versus India. Shortly after they arrived in India, Prime Minister Indira Gandhi was assassinated; with cricket in India then out of the question for a few weeks, the English team went to Sri Lanka to play a couple of warm-up matches.

The tour was nearly called off after the Deputy High Commissioner of Western India, Percy Norris was shot dead on 27 November in Mumbai, the day after hosting a reception for the England team.

Test Series

1st Test

2nd Test

3rd Test

4th Test

5th Test

ODI series

England won the Charminar Challenge Cup 4-1.

1st ODI

2nd ODI

3rd ODI

4th ODI

5th ODI

References
 Playfair Cricket Annual 1985
 Wisden Cricketers Almanack 1985

External links
CricketArchive tour itinerary
Tour Page cricinfo
record cricinfo

1984 in English cricket
1984 in Indian cricket
1984 in Sri Lankan cricket
1985 in English cricket
1985 in Indian cricket
1984-85
1984
Indian cricket seasons from 1970–71 to 1999–2000
International cricket competitions from 1980–81 to 1985
Sri Lankan cricket seasons from 1972–73 to 1999–2000